Boyalıca is a town in Bursa Province, Turkey.

Geography 
Boyalıca is in İznik (ancient Nicaea) district of Bursa Province. The population of Boyalıca was 2407 as of 2012.

History 

During Ottoman Empire era  Boyalıca had a mixed population of Turks (who called themselves as Manav) and Greeks who were the fishermen of the lake.  According to legend, the name of Boyalıca is a corrupt form of Buyalı. (Yalı means "waterfront"). After Russo-Turkish War (1877-1878) Turkish refugees from Bulgaria were settled in Boyalıca. After the Population exchange agreement between Turkey and Greece following the Turkish War of Independence in 1920s, Greeks left Boyalıca. In 1989, during the ethnic cleansing years in Bulgaria, another wave of Turkish families from Bulgaria were also settled in Boyalıca, but after Bulgarian government changed policy towards Turks, most of them returned. (See Turks in Bulgaria) In the same year Boyalıca was declared a seat of township.

Economy

The town economy depends heavily on the farming of olive. Fishing and animal husbandry are other economic activities. Presently, once common sericulture plays no role in economy.

References  

Populated places in Bursa Province
Towns in Turkey
İznik District